Asaphodes dionysias is a species of moth in the family Geometridae. This species is endemic to New Zealand and is only known from mountainous areas in Central Otago. It lives in open grassy mountainous habitat at altitudes up to 1750 m. It is also known to live in wetland habitat. The larvae of this species feed on native herbs. The adults of this species are on the wing in January and February. The adult female of the species has reduced wing size in comparison to the male.

Taxonomy

This species was described by Edward Meyrick in 1907 as Xanthorhoe dionysias using material collected by J.H. Lewis at the Old Man Range in Central Otago in February. George Hudson discussed and illustrated this species under the name Xanthorhoe dionysias in his 1928 publication The Butterflies and Moths of New Zealand. In 1939 Louis Beethoven Prout placed this species in the genus Larentia. This placement was not accepted by New Zealand taxonomists. In 1971 J. S. Dugdale placed this species in the genus Asaphodes. In 1988 J. S. Dugdale confirmed this placement. The female holotype specimen, collected at Old Man Range, is held at the Natural History Museum, London.

Description

Meyrick described the species as follows:
The female of the species is brachypterous.

Distribution
This species is endemic to New Zealand. This moth is known only from a limited area which includes The Remarkables, Ben Lomond, Dunstan Mountains, and Old Man Range in Central Otago.

Biology and life cycle
The adults of this species are on the wing in January and February.

Habitat and host species
This moth prefers open grassy mountainous habitat at altitudes of up to 1750m. It is known to frequent wetland habitat. Larvae of this species feed on herbs found in the wet tussock grassland.

References

Larentiinae
Moths described in 1907
Moths of New Zealand
Endemic fauna of New Zealand
Taxa named by Edward Meyrick
Endemic moths of New Zealand